Nogometni klub Zagora Unešić, commonly referred to as NK Zagora Unešić or simply Zagora Unešić, is a Croatian football club based in Unešić. They currently play in the Croatian Third Football League.

The club has 400 members, in spite of being from a village of only 1500 people.

History
NK Zagora was founded in 1948.

One of the club's most significant moments came in its cup runs in 2007–08. Zagora won the 2007 County Cup, in which scorer Ivo Šupe was given a lamb for his efforts. The county cup qualified them for the national cup, where Zagora made a run to the quarterfinal. Šupe, a postman, would score twice in Zagora's 7–2 two-legged quarterfinal loss against Dinamo Zagreb. Šupe would clarify that Zagora "did not play for lambs."

Honours
Croatian football league system
1. ŽNL (2): 2003–04, 2016–17
County Cup (10): 1995–96, 1997–98, 2006–07, 2007–08, 2009–10, 2012–13, 2014–15, 2015–16, 2016–17

References

External links 
Official website

Football clubs in Croatia
Football clubs in Šibenik-Knin County
Association football clubs established in 1948
1948 establishments in Croatia